Burning Secret is a 1988 drama film, based on the short story Brennendes Geheimnis by Stefan Zweig, about an American diplomat's son who befriends a mysterious baron while staying at an Austrian spa during the 1920s. This symbol-filled story, filmed with sensuous detail and nuance, is set in Austria in the 1920s. While being treated for asthma at a country spa, an American diplomat's lonely 12-year-old son is befriended and infatuated by a suave, mysterious baron. During a story of his war experiences, the baron reveals the scar of a wound from an American soldier and thrusts a pin through it, saying "see—no feeling." Little does the boy realize that it is his turn to be wounded. But soon his adored friend heartlessly brushes him aside and turns his seductive attentions to his mother. The boy's jealousy and feelings of betrayal become uncontrollable.

The film was written and directed by Andrew Birkin, and stars Klaus Maria Brandauer, Faye Dunaway, and David Eberts. The film won the Young Jury Prize at the Brussels Film Festival in 1989, and David Eberts won the Special Jury Prize at the Venice Film Festival in the same year.

According to Birkin, the making of the movie "was something of a nightmare" with the two lead actors thoroughly disliking one another and other problems while shooting on location in Mariánské Lázně while directing young David Eberts was "a joy".

The film was film composer Hans Zimmer's only second feature film scoring.

Lions Gate Home Entertainment has yet to release the film onto DVD.

See also
 The Burning Secret (1923)
 The Burning Secret (1933)

References

External links
 
 

1988 films
West German films
1988 drama films
English-language German films
Films based on works by Stefan Zweig
Films based on short fiction
Films scored by Hans Zimmer
Films directed by Andrew Birkin
Films set in Austria
Films set in the 1920s
Vestron Pictures films
British drama films
Adultery in films
Remakes of German films
British remakes of German films
1980s English-language films
1980s British films